Sandro Zeller (born 16 November 1991 in Uster) is a Swiss race car driver. He is son of the twelve-time Swiss Formula Three champion Jo Zeller who founded team Jo Zeller Racing.

Career

Karting
Zeller made his karting debut in 2006, at the age of fifteen. In first season of the Swiss Rotax Max Challenge Junior he was twelfth, improving to the third place on the next year.

Formula Lista Junior
Zeller began his car racing career by driving in the Formula Lista Junior with Jo Zeller Racing in 2008. He amassed seventeen points and scored one pol on the way to fourteenth place in the championship standings.

He remained in series for 2009 and improved to fifth place. He took one win at Dijon-Prenois and scored eleven point-scoring positions.

Formula Three

After two races in the final round at Motorsport Arena Oschersleben in 2009, Zeller remained in German Formula Three Championship for 2010. Also he competed in the Hockenheimring round of the Austria Formula 3 Cup and Formula 3 Euro Series.

2011 saw his best season to date. He won the Austria Formula 3 Cup winning nine races and completed a part season in the German Formula Three Championship and also the Formula 3 Euro Series.

Racing career

Career summary

† Guest driver – ineligible for points.

Complete Formula 3 Euro Series results
(key)

† – As Zeller was a guest driver, he was ineligible for points.

FIA European Formula 3 Championship results

References

External links

Jo Zeller Racing official website 

1991 births
Living people
Swiss racing drivers
Formula Lista Junior drivers
Austrian Formula Three Championship drivers
German Formula Three Championship drivers
Formula 3 Euro Series drivers
People from Uster
British Formula Three Championship drivers
FIA Formula 3 European Championship drivers
Sportspeople from the canton of Zürich
Jo Zeller Racing drivers
Swiss Formula Three Championship drivers